Gelora Bung Karno Main Stadium (literally "Bung Karno Sports Arena Main Stadium"), formerly Senayan Main Stadium and Gelora Senayan Main Stadium, is a multi-purpose stadium located at the center of the Gelora Bung Karno Sports Complex in Central Jakarta, Indonesia. It is mostly used for football matches. The stadium is named after Sukarno, the then-president of Indonesia, who sparked the idea of building the sports complex.

When first opened prior to the 1962 Asian Games, the stadium had a seating capacity of 110,000. It has been reduced twice during renovations: first to 88,306 in 2006 for the 2007 AFC Asian Cup and then to 77,193 single seats as part of renovations for the 2018 Asian Games and Asian Para Games, where it hosted the ceremonies and athletics competitions. The capacity of 88,083 makes it 7th largest association football stadium in the world. Due to the most recent renovation which saw all remaining bleachers replaced by single seats, it is the 28th largest association football stadium in the world and the 8th largest association football stadium in Asia.

History

Construction began on 8 February 1960 and finished on 21 July 1962, in time to host the following month's Asian Games. Its construction was partially funded through a special loan from the Soviet Union (present Russia). The stadium's original capacity of 110,000 people was reduced to 88,306 as a result of renovations for the 2007 AFC Asian Cup. The stadium is well-known for its ring-shaped facade, the temu gelang also called gigantic ring, which was designed to shade spectators from the sun, and increase the grandeur of the stadium.

Although the stadium is popularly known as Gelora Bung Karno Stadium (Stadion Gelora Bung Karno) or GBK Stadium, its official name is Gelora Bung Karno Main Stadium (Stadion Utama Gelora Bung Karno), as there are other stadiums in the Gelora Bung Karno Sports Complex, such as the Sports Palace and the secondary stadium. It was known as Senajan (EYD: Senayan) Main Stadium from its opening through the 1962 Asiad until the complex's name was changed to Gelora Bung Karno by a Presidential Decree issued on 24 September 1962, twenty days after the games ended. During the New Order era, the complex was renamed "Gelora Senayan Complex" and the stadium was renamed "Gelora Senayan Main Stadium" in 1969 under the "de-Sukarnoization" policy by military junta government Suharto. After the fall of the dictatorship, the complex name was reverted by President Abdurrahman Wahid in a decree effective since 17 January 2001.
The stadium served as the main venue of the 2018 Asian Games and Asian Para Games, hosting the ceremonies and athletics. It underwent renovations in preparation for the events; to comply with FIFA standards, all of the stadium's existing seating was replaced, including its remaining bleachers, making it an all-seater with a capacity of 77,193. The new seats are coloured in red, white, and grey—resembling a waving flag of Indonesia. A new, brighter LED lighting system was also installed, with 620 fixtures, and an RGB lighting system was installed on the stadium's facade. Improvements were also made to the stadium's accessibility.

At the 1985 Perserikatan Final, Match Persib Bandung against PSMS Medan which was held at this stadium became an amateur match with the largest attendance of 150,000 spectators. The match was finally won by PSMS Medan.

Sporting events
GBK Stadium hosted the 2007 Asian Cup final between Iraq and Saudi Arabia and is projected to host the final match of the 2023 FIFA U-20 World Cup. Other competitions held there are several AFF Cup finals and domestic cup finals.

International
 Host of the 1962 and 2018 Asian Games
 Host of the 2018 Asian Para Games
 Host of the 1963 GANEFO
Host of the Muhammad Ali vs. Rudie Lubbers boxing match, October 20, 1973.
 Host of Southeast Asian Games (in 1979, 1987, 1997, and 2011)
 Host of the Asian Athletics Championships (in 1985, 1995, and 2000)
 Host of the 2002 Tiger Cup for 9 out of 10 Group A matches, semifinal matches, third place play-off, and the final.
 Host of the 2003 ASEAN Club Championship.
 Host of the 2004 Tiger Cup first leg semifinal match against Malaysia and first leg final match against Singapore.
 Host of the 2007 AFC Asian Cup for 5 out of 6 Group D matches, quarterfinals between Saudi Arabia and Uzbekistan, and the final.
 Host of the 2008 AFF Suzuki Cup for first leg semifinal match against Thailand
 Host for the F.C. Bayern Munich 2008 Post-season Tour
 Host of the 2010 AFF Suzuki Cup for 5 out of 6 Group A matches, semifinal matches against the Philippines, and second leg final match against Malaysia
 Host for the LA Galaxy 2011 Asia-Pacific Post-season Tour
 Host for all 2 matches of the Inter Milan 2012 Post-season Tour
 Host for the Valencia CF 2012 Asia Preseason Tour (their only match outside Europe)
 Host for the Arsenal F.C. 2013 Asia Preseason Tour
 Host for the Liverpool F.C. 2013 Asia Preseason Tour
 Host for the Chelsea F.C. 2013 Asia Preseason Tour
 Host for the Juventus F.C. 2014 Asia Preseason Tour
 Host of the 2014 Asian Dream Cup against Park Ji-sung and Friends, featuring footballers and celebrities, including the cast of Running Man.
 Host for the A.S. Roma 2015 Asia Preseason Tour
 Host of the 2018 AFC U-19 Championship
 Host of Indonesia's home match at the 2018 AFF Championship
 Host of the 2023 FIFA U-20 World Cup, including the final
 Host of Indonesia's home match at the 2022 AFF Championship

Tournament results

1979 Southeast Asian Games

1987 Southeast Asian Games

1997 Southeast Asian Games

2002 AFF Championship

2004 AFF Championship

2007 AFC Asian Cup

2008 AFF Championship

2010 AFF Championship

2011 Southeast Asian Games

2018 AFC U-19 Championship

2018 AFF Championship

2022 AFF Championship

Other uses

 The Grand Catholic mass led by Pope John Paul II, on 9 October 1989. 
 The 100th anniversary of Indonesian National Awakening day, 20 May 2008
 The political rally for both parliamentary and also presidential elections in 2004, 2009, 2014, and 2019. The 2019 final day campaign for both presidential candidates was held in this stadium. The final campaign was held on 7 and 13 April 2019 respectively. Each final campaign was attended by more than 77,000 supporters, arguably the most attended a one-day campaign rally in the history of the Indonesian presidential campaign. 
 Christmas event jointly organized by the Indonesian Bethel Church for the whole district since 2006 until now (only absent in 2012)
 Indonesia Tiberias Church Christmas Services since 2000 until now (except in 2016 and 2017)
 HKBP Jubileum (147th in 2007 and 150th in 2011)
 The 85th anniversary of Nahdlatul Ulama (2011)
 Caliphate Conference of Hizb ut-Tahrir Indonesia, 6 June 2013
 Admission exams for thousands Indonesian Ministry of Health civil servants applicants on 3 November 2013
 One of the venues in Jakarta used for COVID-19 vaccination serving 60,000 doses of vaccines, 11 July 2021.

Concert events

Transport

KRL Commuterline provides transport service through Palmerah railway station within walking distance from the compound, while Jakarta MRT provides service through Istora Mandiri station. Two corridors of Transjakarta BRT also serve this area. An extension of currently under-construction Greater Jakarta LRT is also planned to serve the western perimeter of the compound.

Gallery

References

Notes

Bibliography

See also
 List of stadiums by capacity
 List of Asian stadiums by capacity
 List of Southeast Asia stadiums by capacity

External links

 Profile on GBK Sports Complex official website (archived)

Indonesia national football team
Persija Jakarta
Multi-purpose stadiums in Indonesia
Athletics (track and field) venues in Jakarta
Football venues in Jakarta
Sports venues in Jakarta
AFC Asian Cup stadiums
National stadiums
Stadiums of the Asian Games
Sports venues completed in 1962
Post-independence architecture of Indonesia
Music venues in Indonesia
1962 establishments in Indonesia
Central Jakarta
Venues of the 1962 Asian Games
Venues of the 2018 Asian Games
Southeast Asian Games stadiums
Southeast Asian Games football venues
Southeast Asian Games athletics venues
Indonesia–Soviet Union relations
Soviet foreign aid
Asian Games athletics venues
Asian Games football venues